Harald Garcke  (born June 5, 1963 in Bremerhaven) is a German mathematician and professor at the University of Regensburg.

Career and important results 
Garcke studied Mathematics and Computer Science at the University of Bonn and finished his PhD 1993 as a student of  Hans Wilhelm Alt (Travelling-Wave-Lösungen als Realisierung von Phasenübergängen bei Gedächtnismetallen). 1993/94 he was  post-doc with Charles M. Elliott at the University of Sussex and from 1994 he was scientific assistant in Bonn where he finished his habilitation in 2000 (with the habilitation thesis On mathematical models for phase separation in elastically stressed solids). In the year  2001 he got offers for professur-positions at the Universities Regensburg and Duisburg. Since 2002 he is full professor at the University of Regensburg where he was dean of the Mathematics department from 2005 to 2007.

Garcke works on nonlinear partial differential equations, free boundary problems, phase field equations, numerical analysis and geometric evolution equations. Together with Christof Eck and Peter Knabner he is the author of a book on mathematical modelling.

His most important works are fundamental results on the Cahn-Hilliard equation, results on the thin film equation  and work with Britta Nestler on phase field models. Work with J.W. Barrett and R. Nürnberg on the mathematics of snow crystals was also well received by the popular media.

References

External links
University of Regensburg
Author Profile in the database zbMATH

1963 births
Living people
20th-century German mathematicians
Academic staff of the University of Regensburg
University of Bonn alumni
21st-century German mathematicians